The 1907 Boston Doves season was the 37th season of the franchise. Before the season, longtime Boston Beaneaters owner Arthur Soden sold the team to the Dovey Brothers. The team quickly became known as the Boston Doves, named after the brothers. One bright spot during a 90-loss season came on May 8, when Big Jeff Pfeffer pitched a no-hitter in a 6–0 home win over the Cincinnati Reds.

Regular season

Season standings

Record vs. opponents

Roster

Player stats

Batting

Starters by position 
Note: Pos = Position; G = Games played; AB = At bats; H = Hits; Avg. = Batting average; HR = Home runs; RBI = Runs batted in

Other batters 
Note: G = Games played; AB = At bats; H = Hits; Avg. = Batting average; HR = Home runs; RBI = Runs batted in

Pitching

Starting pitchers 
Note: G = Games pitched; IP = Innings pitched; W = Wins; L = Losses; ERA = Earned run average; SO = Strikeouts

Other pitchers 
Note: G = Games pitched; IP = Innings pitched; W = Wins; L = Losses; ERA = Earned run average; SO = Strikeouts

Notes

References 
1907 Boston Doves season at Baseball Reference

Boston Doves seasons
Boston Doves
Boston Doves
1900s in Boston